Olga Samulenkova (born 30 June 1978) is a Russian rower. She competed in the women's double sculls event at the 2004 Summer Olympics.

References

1978 births
Living people
Russian female rowers
Olympic rowers of Russia
Rowers at the 2004 Summer Olympics
Rowers from Saint Petersburg